

Theodor Peter Johann Wisch (13 December 1907 – 11 January 1995) was a high-ranking member of the Waffen-SS of Nazi Germany during World War II. He was a commander of the SS Division Leibstandarte (LSSAH) and a recipient of the Knight's Cross of the Iron Cross with Oak Leaves and Swords. He assumed command of the LSSAH in April 1943. He was seriously wounded in combat on the Western Front by a naval artillery barrage in the Falaise Pocket on 20 August 1944, and replaced as division commander by SS-Brigadeführer Wilhelm Mohnke.

Awards
 Iron Cross (1939) 2nd Class (24 September 1939) & 1st Class (8 November 1939)
 German Cross in Gold on 25 February 1943 as SS-Standartenführer in the 2. Panzergrenadier-Regiment SS-Panzergrenadier-Division "Leibstandarte SS Adolf Hitler"
 Knight's Cross of the Iron Cross with Oak Leaves and Swords
 Knight's Cross on 15 September 1941 as SS-Sturmbannführer and commander of the II./LSSAH
 393rd Oak Leaves on 12 February 1944 as SS-Brigadeführer and commander of the LSSAH
 94th Swords on 30 August 1944 as SS-Brigadeführer and Generalmajor of the Waffen-SS, and commander of the LSSAH

See also
List SS-Brigadeführer

References

Citations

Bibliography

External links
 

1907 births
1995 deaths
People from the Province of Schleswig-Holstein
Recipients of the Gold German Cross
Recipients of the Knight's Cross of the Iron Cross with Oak Leaves and Swords
SS-Brigadeführer
Waffen-SS personnel
Military personnel from Schleswig-Holstein
People from Dithmarschen
German amputees